Christpher Grimm (March 18, 1828 – April 20, 1895) was an American businessman and politician.

Grimm was born in Halenbrunn, Bavaria and went to school in Bavaria. In 1846, he emigrated to the United States and settled in Terre Haute, Indiana. In 1865, he moved to Jefferson, Jefferson County, Wisconsin. Grimm was a merchant in Jefferson. Grimm was involved with the Democratic Party. He served as president of the village of Jefferson and as the chairman of the town board. Grimm served on the Jefferson County Board of Supervisors and was the commissioner of public debts. He served in the Wisconsin Assembly in 1893 and 1894. Grimm died suddenly at his home in Jefferson, Wisconsin.

Notes

External links

1828 births
1895 deaths
Bavarian emigrants to the United States
Politicians from Terre Haute, Indiana
People from Jefferson, Wisconsin
Businesspeople from Wisconsin
County supervisors in Wisconsin
Mayors of places in Wisconsin
Democratic Party members of the Wisconsin State Assembly
19th-century American politicians
19th-century American businesspeople